The Cake dress is a confectionery creation, designed and crafted to resemble a fashionable dress in its form and appearance. It embodies an artistic expression of culinary virtuosity and imagination, blending the elegance of haute couture with the indulgence of dessert.

Award 
Natasha Coline Kim Fah Lee Fokas, a baker from Switzerland, has achieved recognition from the Guinness World Record for creating the largest wearable cake dress in the world, with a weight of 131.15 kilograms and a sturdy support system. To break the world record, the cake must weigh 68 kg or more and the model must walk 5 meters without the dress falling apart. Natasha Coline Kim Fah Lee Fokas undertook her attempt to break the world record during the Swiss World Wedding fair. On January 15th, 2023, in Bern, Switzerland, she presented her dress, which was crafted from materials commonly utilized in cake-making,to the public.

References 

Wearable art
Cakes
Dresses